Hearts of Fire is a 1987 American musical drama film starring Bob Dylan, Fiona Flanagan (billed only as "Fiona") and Rupert Everett. The film was essentially a vehicle for Dylan based on his success as a rock musician. It received poor reviews, a limited theatrical release, and was later written off by Dylan himself.

Cast
Fiona Flanagan as Molly McGuire
Bob Dylan as Billy Parker
Rupert Everett as James Colt
Richie Havens as Pepper Ward
Julian Glover as Alfred
Suzanne Bertish as Anne Ashton
Larry Lamb as Jack Rosner
Maury Chaykin as Charlie Kelso
Lesleh Donaldson as Penny
Jeremy Ratchford as Jimbo
Mark Rylance as Fizz
Ian Dury as Bones
Susannah Hoffmann as Blind Woman

Origin and filming
Originally written by Scott Richardson, the screenplay was rewritten by Basic Instinct writer Joe Eszterhas because Lorimar Productions felt that Richardson was a "baby writer" and not experienced enough to take on the responsibility of a starring vehicle for a rock icon of Dylan's stature. Hearts of Fire is also regarded as the film that "killed Richard Marquand", director of Return of the Jedi, who would die of a stroke later the same year.

The film was shot in Canada (Hamilton and Toronto) at the defunct Davenport Works of the Canadian General Electric Company and the United Kingdom (Southerndown and Coney Beach at Porthcawl).Also Cardiff airport substituting for Heathrow  The film's concert scenes were shot at the Colston Hall in Bristol, and Camden, North London (UK).  Concert scenes filmed at Copps Coliseum in Hamilton, Ontario.

Release
Hearts of Fire did poorly in theaters. It was first released in the UK in 1987 and was pulled from the theaters after approximately two weeks. As a result, the film was released to a very few theaters in the United States for one week only. All plans to set to release the film nationwide, which was planned for release by Lorimar Motion Pictures, but the film was set to limbo, citing the negative reviews of the feature film.

Home media
In the United States, the film was released directly to video by Warner Home Video in 1990 after a very short theatrical run. The film was re-released on VHS by Warner Brothers on December 6, 1993.

The film was released digitally for purchase through iTunes and Vudu.

Reviews
Variety lamented that it was "unfortunate that the last film of helmer Richard Marquand, who died shortly after completing it, should be Hearts of Fire" and that the film failed "to fire on all cylinders despite a nimble performance by the enigmatic Bob Dylan typecast as a reclusive rock star." Channel 4 deemed the film a "blunt instrument of 80s vacuity." DVDLaser stated that it is "a really bad movie," but also that the viewer's opinion of Bob Dylan is "the key to liking or disliking the film."

Time Out London said that Dylan "hovers enigmatically on the sidelines, offering jaundiced comments."

Soundtrack
In 1987, Columbia Records released the soundtrack to the film. Dylan was apparently originally contracted to write and contribute four new original recordings to the album but only turned in two original songs and one cover song. The tracks included a cover of John Hiatt's "The Usual", along with the Dylan originals "Night After Night" and "Had a Dream About You Baby". Dylan later released an alternate version of "Had a Dream About You Baby" on the 1988 album Down in the Groove.

References

External links
 
 
 

1987 films
1980s musical drama films
American musical drama films
Films about Bob Dylan
Films directed by Richard Marquand
Films shot in Hamilton, Ontario
Films shot in Toronto
Films shot in Wales
Films with screenplays by Joe Eszterhas
Films scored by John Barry (composer)
1987 drama films
1980s English-language films
1980s American films